Milan Krkobabić (born 12 October 1952) is a Serbian politician serving as minister of rural welfare since 2020. A member of the Krkobabić political family, he is the current leader of the Party of United Pensioners of Serbia (PUPS). Additionally, he served as minister without portfolio from 2016 to 2020.

Krkobabić has been a member of the National Assembly since 2022, a role which he previously held from 2012 to 2016 and briefly in 2020. He also served as deputy mayor of Belgrade from 2008 to 2012, and as a member of the City Assembly of Belgrade in 2008, and again from 2012 to 2013, and again briefly in 2014.

Early life and career 
Krkobabić was born in Kačarevo, Autonomous Province of Vojvodina, in what was then the People's Republic of Serbia in the Federal People's Republic of Yugoslavia. He later moved with his family to Belgrade, where he completed high school and graduated from the University of Belgrade Faculty of Economics. He has thirty years of experience in the financial sector.

His father, Jovan Krkobabić, was the founder and first leader of the PUPS.

Political career 
Krkobabić joined the PUPS on its formation in 2005. The party contested the 2007 Serbian parliamentary election on a combined electoral list with the Social Democratic Party (Socijaldemokratska partija, SDP), and Krkobabić was included in the 105th position. The list did not cross the electoral threshold to win representation in the assembly.

City of Belgrade 
The PUPS formed an alliance with the Socialist Party of Serbia (Socijalistička partija Srbije, SPS) prior to the 2008 parliamentary election. Krkobabić was not a candidate at the republic level but instead received the second position on the SPS-led list in the concurrent 2008 Belgrade City Assembly election. The list won six seats, and he was granted a mandate in the city assembly. Neither the republic nor the Belgrade city elections produced a clear winner, and representatives of the Socialist Party, the far-right Serbian Radical Party (Srpska radikalna stranka, SRS), and the Democratic Party of Serbia (Demokratska stranka Srbije, DSS) discussed forming coalition governments at both levels. Krkobabić said that this arrangement would be acceptable to the PUPS, as it would ensure the passage of parts of the party's program.

Discussions among these parties subsequently broke down, and the Socialists instead formed coalition governments at both levels with the For a European Serbia alliance led by the Democratic Party (Demokratska stranka, DS). The PUPS participated in the new governments, and Krkobabić indicated that his party would use its influence to fight for a pension increase and resist any efforts to impose neoliberal reforms. He himself became Belgrade's deputy mayor, serving under Dragan Đilas.

In October 2009, Krkobabić and Russian ambassador Aleksandr Konuzin inaugurated a statue of Alexander Pushkin in the centre of Belgrade, not far from the statues of Cyril and Methodius and Vuk Karadžić. 

Krkobabić later defended the city's decision to erect a statue of former Azerbaijani president Heydar Aliyev in Tašmajdan Park, a space that the government of Azerbaijan had donated two million Euros to renovate after extensive damage in the 1999 NATO bombing of Yugoslavia. The statue attracted controversy due to the Azerbaijani president's human rights record while in office. Krkobabić stated in response, "Our principle was not to be policemen and to investigate what was done in the past because we would not have time for that. Our principle was to draw a line and to move forward. In these hard times, we are trying to accept every act of goodwill by various countries and to use them for the benefit of the citizens of Belgrade."

National Assembly and Pošta Srbije 
The PUPS maintained its alliance with the Socialist Party for the 2012 Serbian parliamentary election. Krkobabić was a spokesperson for his party in this campaign, highlighting its promise to protect and improve pensions. He was given the thirteenth position on the SPS-led list and was elected to his first term in the national assembly when the list won forty-four mandates. He also received the second position on the Socialist-led list in the concurrent 2012 Belgrade election and was re-elected when the list won thirteen seats. He served in both assemblies under a dual mandate.

The Socialist Party formed a new coalition government with the Serbian Progressive Party (Srpska napredna stranka, SNS) and other parties at the republic level after the 2012 election. The PUPS was included in the coalition, and Krkobabić served as part of the government's parliamentary majority. He led the PUPS group in the assembly and was chosen as a party vice-president. He was also appointed as director of the state-owned corporation Pošta Srbije.

He announced plans to privatize certain entities owned by the corporation, including Telekom Srbija and the Belgrade Nikola Tesla Airport, in November 2012. Shortly thereafter, he said that the corporation itself would not be privatized but would seek to acquire assets in other Balkan states. Krkobabić was quoted as saying, "We will not repeat the experiences from the neighbouring countries. This system will strengthen, it will be profitable, fill the budget and create new jobs. We put an end to all attempts to sell, sell off, and disintegrate the system." In the same period, he announced that the corporation would focus on completing a number of capital investment projects, including a central postal hub in Belgrade. He announced in July 2013 that the corporation had tripled its net income in the first six months of the year.

Despite its alliance with the Socialists and Progressives at the republic level, the PUPS continued to work in a coalition government with the DS in Belgrade. Krkobabić's term as deputy mayor ended in June 2012, but he initially continued to support Đilas's administration at the city level and opposed the SNS's efforts to change the government. In November 2012, he was a guest at the Democratic Party convention that elected Đilas as the party's new leader. This alliance ultimately did not last, however, and in September 2013 Krkobabić and the PUPS withdrew their support for Đilas in a crucial vote of non-confidence. Đilas lost his assembly majority and resigned as mayor. These events led to new elections in both Belgrade and Serbia as a whole in early 2014.

Krkobabić was promoted to the second position on the Socialist-led list in the republic election. During the campaign, he said that Serbian politics had become marked by "a split between the left and the right, where the left is working for the people, and the right-wing is lining its pockets." Progressive Party leader Aleksandar Vučić responded to this by remarking, "if that's the way to look at it, Krkobabić belongs to the extreme right-wing." The Socialist list again won forty-four mandates, and Krkobabić was elected to a second term. The Progressive Party and its allies won a majority victory overall. Following the election, the Progressives formed a new coalition government that once again included the Socialists. The PUPS did not participate directly in government but provided outside support; notwithstanding his exchange with Vučić in the campaign, Krkobabić supported the latter's administration in the assembly. He was a member of the assembly's committee on administrative, budgetary, mandate, and immunity issues and also continued to serve as Pošta Srbije director.

Krkobabić also received the second position on the Socialist-led list in the 2014 Belgrade campaign. He was re-elected when the list won sixteen seats, although on this occasion he resigned his city mandate shortly thereafter.

Party leader 
Jovan Krkobabić died in April 2014, and Milan was formally designated as his successor as PUPS leader in June of the same year.

In July 2014, he indicated that the PUPS would support two contentious bills dealing with changes to labour law and pension and disability insurance; he justified this decision on the basis that the reforms, "[did] not affect the existing pensioners." He argued in support of direct payouts to Pošta Srbije workers in October of the same year, saying that the workers should receive a percentage of the corporation's profits.

Vučić and Krkobabić opened Pošta Srbije's central Belgrade hub on 9 October 2014. The corporation continued to earn net profits through 2015, and Krkobabić again opposed calls for its privatization. In October 2015, he noted that Toshiba had expressed interest in pairing with Pošta Srbije for investments in Russia. The following year, he and Rasim Ljajić, Serbia's minister of trade, tourism, and telecommunications, signed a collective agreement with Pošta Srbije workers that, among other things, confirmed their right to a share of the profits.

In May 2016, he announced that Pošta Srbije would set up a commercial bank.

Government minister 
The PUPS ended its electoral alliance with the Socialist Party and formed a new partnership with the Progressives for the 2016 Serbian parliamentary election. Krkobabić received the fourth position on the SNS-led list and was re-elected when it won a second consecutive majority with 131 out of 250 mandates. On 11 August 2016, he was appointed as a minister without portfolio in Vučić's administration, in charge of regional development. After this appointment, he stood down as director of Pošta Srbije. He was later given additional responsibilities as chair of Serbia's council for coordination of activities and measures for gross domestic product (GDP) growth."

Krkobabić was reaffirmed in his ministerial role after Ana Brnabić replaced Vučić as prime minister of Serbia in June 2017. Shortly after this, he announced a significant government investment in agricultural co-operatives as a means of ensuring that younger people could choose to remain in rural settings. In January 2018, he announced that 250 co-operatives had thus far been created under his government's supervision. Two years later, he said that the number had increased to 722. Krkobabić has described cooperatives as the greatest opportunity for the survival of Serbia's family farms.

The PUPS continued its alliance with the Progressive Party in the 2020 Serbian parliamentary election. Krkobabić received the twenty-fourth position on the Progressive-led electoral list and was again elected to the assembly when the list won a landslide victory with 188 seats. (His son Stefan Krkobabić was also elected as a PUPS member.) He was promoted to a full cabinet portfolio in October 2020 as Serbia's first minister for rural welfare. Following the appointment, he indicated that one of his priorities would be organizing the transfer of uncultivated state land to young farmers and young experts. In April 2021, he spoke in favour of creating a "green ring" around Belgrade to supply fresh and healthy food products to Belgrade and other Serbian cities. At the same time, he announced a program for allocating empty houses, of which he indicated there were around 150,000 in Serbia. In January 2022, he announced that half a billion dollars would be allocated for the purchase of another five hundred houses.

Krkbabić received the thirty-fifth position on the SNS-led list in the 2022 Serbian parliamentary election and was re-elected when the list won a plurality victory with 120 mandates. He resigned his parliamentary mandate on 24 October 2022 after being re-appointed as a member of cabinet.

References

1952 births
Living people
People from Kačarevo
Politicians from Belgrade
Members of the National Assembly (Serbia)
Members of the City Assembly of Belgrade
Government ministers of Serbia
Party of United Pensioners of Serbia politicians